The 1966 Women's Asian Games Volleyball Tournament was the 2nd edition of the event, organized by the Asian governing body, the AVC. It was held in Bangkok, Thailand from 10 to 19 December 1966.

Results

Final standing

References
 Results

External links
OCA official website

Women's Volleyball